Guillermo Cerda Martínez (born 13 February 1984) is a Mexican former footballer who played as a defender.

References

1984 births
Living people
Footballers from Mexico City
Association football defenders
Club América footballers
Club Puebla players
San Luis F.C. players
Liga MX players
Mexican footballers